Soft tennis was a discipline of the tennis competitions at the 1998 Asian Games. Competition took place from December 11 to December 15. All events were held at the Tennis Field 3 in Thammasat University, Bangkok, Thailand.

There were four doubles and team events at the competition.

Schedule

Medalists

Medal table

Participating nations
A total of 86 athletes from 11 nations competed in soft tennis at the 1998 Asian Games:

References 
 Results
 Results

External links 
 Olympic Council of Asia

1998 Asian Games events
1998
 
1998 in soft tennis